HD 179791 is suspected variable star in the equatorial constellation of Aquila. It is a challenge to see with the naked eye even under good viewing conditions, having an apparent visual magnitude of 6.48. It is moving further from the Earth with a heliocentric radial velocity of +16 km/s. Astrometric measurements of the star show changes in motion that may indicate it is a member of a close binary system.

This is an A-type main-sequence star with a stellar classification of A3 V. It is a suspected chemically peculiar star and formerly a candidate Lambda Boötis star. The status as a Lambda Boötis star was reviewed and changed to non-member in 2015. It is spinning rapidly with a projected rotational velocity of 196 km/s. The star has 2.55 times the mass of the Sun and about 2.5 times the Sun's radius. It is radiating 66 times the Sun's luminosity from its photosphere at an effective temperature of 8,912 K.

References

External links
 HR 7288
 Image HD 179791

A-type main-sequence stars
Suspected variables
Aquila (constellation)
Durchmusterung objects
179791
094773
7288